Schizophrenia is a 1997 Russian crime film directed by Viktor Sergeyev.

Plot 
The film tells about the connections of the criminal part of Russia with the government.

Cast 
 Armen Dzhigarkhanyan
 Aleksandr Abdulov
 Nikolay Trofimov
 Kirill Lavrov
 Natalya Antonova
 Andrei Baranov
 Leonid Bronevoy
 Nikolay Dik
 Anatoli Dmitriyev
 Vladimir Ermilov

References

External links 
 

1997 films
1990s crime action films
1990s Russian-language films
Russian crime action films